This is a timeline of the Republic of Texas, spanning the time from the Texas Declaration of Independence from Mexico on March 2, 1836, up to the transfer of power to the State of Texas on February 19, 1846.

1836
Texas Declares Independence

March 2 – The Texas Declaration of Independence is signed by 58 delegates at an assembly at Washington-on-the-Brazos and the Republic of Texas is declared. David G. Burnet is elected ad interim president by the delegates. Texians with Dr. James Grant are defeated at the Battle of Agua Dulce.
1836 March 3 – James B. Bonham arrives back at the Alamo telling Lt. Col. William B. Travis that Col. James Fannin was not coming.
March 4 – Santa Anna holds a council of war with Generals Joaquín Ramírez y Sesma, Martín Perfecto de Cos, Manuel F. Castrillón and Colonels Juan Almonte, Agustín Amat, Francisco Duque and Manuel Romero Rubio to plan the final assault. Sam Houston is appointed commander of Texas forces.
March 6 – Battle of the Alamo: the Alamo falls. Approximately 190-250 Texians and Tejanos died. The thirteen-day siege resulted in the deaths of all of its defenders, including William B. Travis, Davy Crockett, and Jim Bowie.
March 11 – Houston begins his retreat from Gonzales precipitating the Runaway Scrape. 
March 12 – Battle of Refugio begins: Texian troops commanded by Lieutenant-Colonel William Ward and Amos King are attacked by General Urrea. After several hours of fighting, the Texians retreat.
March 15 - Ward's troops are captured by the Mexicans.
March 16 - David G. Burnet becomes interim president of the Republic of Texas.
March 19 – Battle of Coleto: General Urrea corners Colonel James Fannin near Goliad.
March 20 – Fannin surrenders.
March 21 – The Battle of Copano is fought.
March 22 – King's troops are captured by the Mexicans.
March 27 – Goliad Massacre: James Fannin and nearly 400 Texians are executed by order of Santa Anna. Houston and his army camp near San Felipe de Austin.
April 21 – Battle of San Jacinto: Texian army under Sam Houston overwhelmingly defeats Mexican force under Santa Anna, securing Texas independence.  Santa Anna captured.
May 14 – Treaties of Velasco signed by Republic of Texas officials and General Santa Anna ending the Texas Revolution.
October 3 - The 1st Congress of the Republic of Texas assembles at Columbia.
October 22 - Sam Houston becomes president of the republic.

1837
March 1 - The United States recognizes Texas's independence.
April - Houston becomes the sixth temporary capital of the republic.

1838

October 5 - Disaffected band of Cherokee kills or abducts 18 extended-family members in the Killough massacre, the largest Native American attack on white settlers in Texas.
December 10 - Mirabeau B. Lamar becomes president of the republic.

1839
March - An uprising of Nacogdoches-area Tejanos who did not support independence from Mexico culminated in the Córdova Rebellion and its defeat at Battleground Prairie in Guadalupe County.
July 12 - The Cherokee under The Bowl accept President Lamar's proposal of relocation to the adjacent Arkansas Territory in the United States but refuse to begin preparations for departure after asking for an extension to collect their already planted crops.
July 15 - The first day of the Battle of the Neches repulses a Cherokee attack against the Texian army under General Kelsey Douglass.
July 16 - The second day of the Battle of the Neches ends in a rout of the Cherokee, scattering them and their allies from their settlements on the upper Neches. Generals Rusk and Burleson command the Texians, and Vice President David G. Burnet and Secretary of War Albert Sidney Johnston are both wounded. Both Cherokee chiefs, The Bowl and Big Mush, are killed.
September 25 - France recognizes Texas's independence.
October - The capital

1840
March 19: Council House Fight
June 1: Forces gathered in San Patricio, Texas to organize the Republic of the Rio Grande expedition.
August 6–8: Comanche raids sacked Victoria and Linnville.
August 12: Battle of Plum Creek

1841

June - 321 men under Hugh McLeod and George Thomas Howard at the behest of President Mirabeau B. Lamar began an invasion of Santa Fe. After confusing the Wichita River for the Red River they arrived on October 5 near present-day Tucumcari, New Mexico, were captured without firing a shot and were marched to prison at the San Carlos Fortress in Perote, Veracruz before ultimately being released in June 1842.  The disgrace was to lead to the return of Sam Houston.
December 13 - Sam Houston becomes president of the republic.

1842
March - A division of the Mexican Army led by Ráfael Vásquez invades Texas and captures San Antonio and Goliad, only to withdraw a few days later.
June – July - A division of the Mexican Army led by Antonio Canales Rosillo invades south Texas and is repulsed near Fort Lipantitlán.
September 11 - A division of the Mexican Army led by Gen. Adrián Woll invades Texas and captures San Antonio.
September 18 - Col. Mathew Caldwell's and Capt. Jack Hays' companies attack General Woll's army at the Battle of Salado Creek.
September 18 - 36 Texians are surrounded and killed by the Mexican Army in the Dawson Massacre. 
December 26 - 261 Texians are taken prisoner in the ill-fated Mier Expedition, after they cause about 800 casualties in Pedro de Ampudia's force at the Battle of Mier, where they were outnumbered ten to one by the Mexican Army.
December 29 - The people of Austin fire on Texian officials, who attempted to move the government records to Houston at Pres. Houston's request, in the Texas Archive War.

1843
 April 24 – August 6, Snively Expedition; an operation led by Jacob Snively to intercept a train of Mexican traders who would be returning from Missouri on the Santa Fe Trail by way of Texas territory and to seize their goods. This was to be in retaliation for the Mexican raids on San Antonio in 1842 and for the mistreatment of Texas prisoners captured in the Mier Expedition and on the Texian Santa Fe Expedition.  Despite defeating a detachment of Mexican soldiers on the Arkansas River, they caused a border incident with the United States, and were disarmed by U. S. Dragoons.  Those who remained were not strong enough to defeat the guard on the train and returned to Texas.
 May 16 - Two sloops-of-war of the Texas Navy of the Republic engage Mexican naval vessels in the Naval Battle of Campeche.

1844
September 16 - All Texas prisoners are released by Mexico on order from Santa Anna.
December 9 - Anson Jones becomes president of the republic.

1845
February 28 - The United States Congress passes a bill that would authorize the United States to annex the Republic of Texas.
March 1 - United States President John Tyler signs the authorization bill. 
October 13 - A majority of voters in the Republic approve a proposed Texas state constitution.
December 29 - The Republic of Texas is annexed by the United States of America.

1846
February 19 - Power is transferred from the Republic of Texas to the State of Texas.

References

External links
Texas Independence Website

Republic of Texas
History of the Southern United States
Texas-related lists